Vishnudas Bhave (d. 9 August 1901) and was the leading dramatist of Maharashtra, India and considered as pioneer of Marathi theatre. He was born in Sangli and he staged the first Marathi-language play Sita Swayamvar in Sangli in 1843. In this venture, Bhave was supported by the then king of the  princely state of Sangli. After the success of the play Sita Swayamvar, Bhave staged plays on various other episodes of the Ramayana. He traveled  with his troupes for the plays. He also ventured into puppet shows. Bhave died on 9 August 1901.

Life 
In Maharashtra, the commercial theatrical activity began in 1843 with Bhave's company Sanglikar Natak Mandali. The drama company was initially influenced by English plays. Bhave acted as playwright, director and organiser of the plays. He also set up a drama school in Sangli. In 1853, Bhave came to Mumbai and in the beginning he staged his "Khel-Akhyan" (play-narrations in verse) and plays in the wada of Vishvanath Shimpi in the Girgaum locality of the city. The stories of his plays were rooted in Hindu mythological and religious literature. Songs and music were the strengths of Bhave's dramas. His play Sita Swayamvar became very popular and received much encomium. For the most part, Bhave's plays were one-man shows, with other cast playing strictly supporting and secondary roles only when their presence was needed. The tradition of full-fledged drama was revived much later in 1880s by Annasaheb Kirloskar, who is credited more often than Bhave as the pioneer of Marathi theatre.

The King of the princely state of Sangli, Chintamanrao 'Appa Saheb' Patwardhan gave his patronage and encouragement to Bhave, who had extended his drama activity to Mumbai and Pune.

The history of Marathi Theater records that "Bhave produced plays in Marathi with music composed on Karnataki base. His play was much admired by the Governor's Secretary... religious spirit, scientific singing by a sort of chorus in the midst of dialogues by other characters, crude dances and quaint costumes and make-up and certain skillful sword-play were their outstanding qualities. One has to remember that the audience was very devotional in character".

Besides Vishnudas Bhave's company other drama companies also came into existence, chief among them being Mumbaikar Natak Mandali, Amarchand Wadikar Natak Mandali, and Chaulwadi Hindu Natak Mandali. The plays by these drama companies attracted large audiences.

Before 1843 in Tamil Nadu, Tanjore Maratha king Raja Shahaji Bhonsle had written plays, which were performed in the court and the temple. 

It was after 1843 that the Marathi theater began to progress. University education had begun in Maharashtra. In 1868 Vinayak Kirti entered the Marathi Theater with his historical drama Madhavrao Peshwa. The plays by Vishnudas Bhave and later playwrights were distinguished by excessive prominence to songs and music but Vinayak Kirti's Madhavrao Peshwa had absolutely no songs or musical recitals; instead the whole drama was acted with dialogues which were totally in prose. Here the Marathi drama branches off in two directions - Prose Plays and Verse Plays. Now the Marathi Theater was on its un-interrupted march.

Vishnudas Bhave Gaurav Padak 
In memory of Bhave, an award named "Vishnudas Bhave Gaurav Padak" was instituted by Akhil Bharatiya Natya Vidyamandir where the first recipient of the award was Bal Gandharva in 1959. After few years, the award was presented annually in a ceremony held in Sangli on every 5th November (Marathi Rangbhumi Din). Notable recipients of the award are: Pralhad Keshav Atre, Purushottam Laxman Deshpande, Jyotsna Bhole, Hirabai Barodekar, Dilip Prabhavalkar, Nilu Phule, Jabbar Patel, Sudha Karmarkar, Prabhakar Panshikar, Mohan Agashe, Vijay Tendulkar (2000), Vikram Gokhale (2015), Mohan Joshi (2017), Rohini Hattangadi (2019), and Satish Alekar (2022).

The award was not conferred in 1976 (due to the Emergency), 2020 and 2021 (both years due to COVID-19 lockdowns). In 2000, the recipient of the award was declared as Vijay Tendulkar. However, since he could not travel to receive the award, the ceremony was cancelled.

References

Further reading 
 
http://bharatiyadrama.com/marathi.htm
 

Indian male dramatists and playwrights
1901 deaths
Marathi people
Marathi theatre
People from Sangli district
Year of birth missing
Dramatists and playwrights from Maharashtra
20th-century Indian dramatists and playwrights
20th-century Indian male writers